Michael King may refer to:
Michael King (historian) (1945–2004), New Zealand popular historian, author and biographer
Michael King (baseball) (born 1995), American baseball player
Michael F. King, original developer of the ProvideX computer language
Michael King (commentator) (born 1962), conservative columnist
Michael King (golfer) (born 1950), English golfer
Michael Phillip King (born 1985), musician and member of the pop band King
Michael King (footballer) (born 1991), English association football player
Michael King (graphic designer), American graphic designer
Michael King (radio host), host of American radio program Home Talk USA
Martin Luther King Sr. (1899–1984), born Michael King, American Baptist pastor and missionary
Martin Luther King Jr. (1929–1968), born Michael King Jr., American Baptist minister and activist
Michael Patrick King (born 1954), American director, writer and producer
Michael W. King (born 1952), American producer, writer and director
Meir Kahane (1932–1990), American author who used the pseudonym of Michael King
Michael Weston King (born 1961), English singer and songwriter
Michael Lee King (born 1971), perpetrator of the murder of Denise Amber Lee

See also
Mick King (1905–1961), Irish hurler
Mike King (disambiguation)